The 455th Flying Training Squadron is a United States Air Force unit of Air Education and Training Command.  It was most recently activated at NAS Pensacola as part of the 479th Flying Training Group, where it trains Combat Systems Officers with the Raytheon T-6 Texan II.

The squadron was first activated during World War II as the 455th Bombardment Squadron.  After training in the United States, it deployed to the European Theater of Operations, earning a Distinguished Unit Citation before returning to the United States for inactivation.  It was activated again in the reserves in 1949.  It was mobilized in 1951 for the Korean War and inactivated, as its personnel were used as fillers for other units.

The squadron was redesignated the 455th Fighter-Bomber Squadron and activated in Tactical Air Command in 1955, but inactivated two years later.  In 1973 it was activated at Mather Air Force Base, where it trained navigators until it was inactivated on 1 October 1993.  It was reactivated in October 2009.

History

World War II

Organization and training in the United States
The squadron was first activated as the 455th Bombardment Squadron at Columbia Army Air Base, South Carolina on 4 August 1942 as one of the four original squadrons of the 323d Bombardment Group. The air echelon of the squadron had moved to Baer Field, Indiana in February. At Baer, it received new B-26Cs, then proceeded to the United Kingdom via the south Atlantic ferry route by June.

Combat in Europe

The squadron began operations with Eighth Air Force in July 1943 as part of the first raid on the European continent by B-26s. When Ninth Air Force moved to the United Kingdom in the fall of 1943, the squadron became part of it.  It attacked airports, industrial factories, marshalling yards and military targets in France and the Low Countries.  During Big Week the squadron attacked Leeuwarden and Venlo Airfields.  The squadron also attacked V-weapons launch sites in France.

In preparation for Operation Overlord, the Invasion of Normandy, the 455th attacked coastal defenses and other targets in northwestern France.  on D-Day it attacked lines of communication and fortifications on the coast.  It was part of the aerial barrage during the opening stage of Operation Cobra, the breakout at Saint Lo.

In late August 1944, the squadron left England for Lessay Airfield, an advanced landing ground in France.  From the continent, it began flying night missions, with its first night mission against batteries near Saint-Malo.  It also carried out night missions against ammunition dumps and fuel storage areas.  In September, it attacked fortifications near Brest, France, and as allied forces advanced across France, toward the Siegfried Line shifted its operations primarily to targets in eastern France.  The squadron was awarded a Distinguished Unit Citation for striking transportation hubs used by the Wehrmacht to bring reinforcements to the Ardennes during the Battle of the Bulge.

The 455th flew interdiction missions in the Ruhr as the Allies drove across Germany and attacked enemy communications.  It flew its last combat in April 1945, then moved to Kempten, Germany, where it participated in the program to disarm Germany.  It returned to the United States in November and was inactivated at Camp Myles Standish, Massachusetts, the port of embarkation, a day later.

Air Force reserve
The squadron was reactivated under Continental Air Command (ConAC) as a reserve unit at Tinker Air Force Base in June 1949, when ConAC reorganized its reserve units under the wing base organization system. At Tinker, it trained under the supervision of ConAC's 2592d Air Force Reserve Training Center. The squadron flew a mix of trainers and Douglas A-26 Invaders. The unit was manned at only 25% of its normal strength. All reserve combat units were mobilized for the Korean war. The squadron was mobilized on 10 March 1951.  Its personnel and aircraft were used as fillers for other organizations ond the squadron was inactivated a week later.

Fighter operations
Reactivated as an air defense interceptor squadron in Alaska in 1955; reassigned to Tactical Air Command in 1955 and moved to Indiana.  Inactivated in 1957 due to budget reductions

Flying training
Reactivated by Air Training Command as a navigator training squadron in 1973; inactivated with the closure of Mather Air Force Base and the inactivation of its host unit in 1993. Reactivated by the Air Education and Training Command as a USAF Combat Systems Officer (formerly known as USAF Navigator) training squadron at NAS Pensacola in 2010.

Lineage
 Constituted as the 455th Bombardment Squadron, Medium on 19 June 1942
 Activated on 4 August 1942
 Inactivated on 12 December 1945
 Redesignated 455th Bombardment Squadron, Light on 10 May 1949
 Activated in the reserve on 27 June 1949
 Ordered to active service 10 March 1951
 Inactivated on 17 March 1951
 Redesignated 455th Fighter-Bomber Squadron on 9 May 1955
 Activated on 8 August 1955
 Inactivated on 1 September 1957
 Redesignated 455th Flying Training Squadron on 28 July 1972
 Activated on 31 May 1973
 Inactivated on 1 October 1993
 Activated on 2 October 2009

Assignments
 323d Bombardment Group, 4 August 1942 – 26 November 1945
 323d Bombardment Group, 27 June 1949 – 17 March 1951
 11th Air Division, 8 August 1955
 323d Fighter-Bomber Group, 22 November 1955 – 1 September 1957
 323d Flying Training Wing, 1 April 1973 – 1 October 1993
 479th Flying Training Group, 2 October 2009 – present

Stations

 Columbia Army Air Base, South Carolina, 4 August 1942
 MacDill Field, Florida, 21 August 1942
 Myrtle Beach Bombing Range, South Carolina, 2 November 1942 – 25 April 1943
 RAF Horham (AAF-119), England, 12 May 1943
 RAF Earls Colne (AAF-358), England, 14 June 1943
 RAF Beaulieu (AAF-408), England, 21 July 1944
 Lessay Airfield (A-20), France, 26 August 1944
 Chartres Airfield (A-40), France, 21 September 1944
 Laon/Athies Airfield (A-69), France, 13 October 1944

 Denain/Prouvy Airfield (A-83), France, 9 February 1945
 AAF Station Gablingen (R-77), Germany, 8 May 1945
 AAF Station Leipheim (R-59), Germany, 23 May 1945
 Clastres Airfield (A-71), France, October–December 1945
 Camp Myles Standish, Massachusetts, 11–12 December 1945
 Tinker Air Force Base, Oklahoma, 27 June 1949 – 17 March 1951
 Eielson Air Force Base, Alaska, 8 August 1955
 Bunker Hill Air Force Base, Indiana, 20 November 1955 – 1 September 1957.
 Mather Air Force Base, California, 1 April 1973 – 1 October 1993
 NAS Pensacola, Florida, 2 October 2009 – present

Aircraft

 Martin B-26 Marauder, 1942–1945
 Douglas B-26 Invader, 1949–1951
 North American T-6 Texan, by 1949–1951
 Beechcraft T-7 Navigator, 1950–1951
 Beechcraft T-11 Kansan, by 1949–1951
 North American F-86 Sabre, 1955–1956
 North American F-100 Super Sabre, 1957-1957
 Convair T-29 Flying Classroom 1973–1975
 Cessna T-37 Tweet 1973–1993
 Boeing T-43 Bobcat 1973–2010
 Raytheon T-6 Texan II 2010–present

References

Notes

Bibliography

 
 
 
 
 
 
 
 

0455